Pavlo Simtikidis, often called simply Pavlo (born June 29, 1969) is a Greek-Canadian guitarist who plays, "a Mediterranean sound mixing the folkloric styles of Greek, Spanish and Latin music with pop sensibilities." Born in Toronto, Canada, he is the son of Greek immigrants, George & Freda Simtikidis, of Kastoria, Greece. 
His albums Pavlo and Fantasia certified Gold in Canada, and album Fantasia was nominated in 2001 for a JUNO Award (Canadian Grammy) for Best Instrumental Album.

His next recording project Trifecta was released in 2009 in collaboration with Oscar Lopez and Rik Emmett (lead guitarist from rock group, Triumph) was nominated in 2010 for a JUNO Award (Canadian Grammy) for Instrumental Album of The Year.

Pavlo has sold more than a 500,000 records.

Awards and nominations 

Juno Awards
The Juno Awards is a Canadian awards ceremony presented annually by the Canadian Academy of Recording Arts and Sciences. Pavlo received 2 nominations.

|-
|  || Fantasia || Best Instrumental Album || 
|-
|  || Trifecta (Pavlo, Rik Emmett, Oscar Lopez) || Instrumental Album of the Year || 
|-

Juno Awards Artist Summary Pavlo

Music Canada Gold and Platinum Certification Awards Certifications

Certified albums 
Pavlo (1998) Certified: Gold

Fantasia (2000) Certified: Gold

Music Canada Gold/Platinum Artist Summary Pavlo

Career Highlights 
 PBS Special "Pavlo: Mediterranean Nights" – aired nationally by networks: Bravo and CBC Bold in Canada and PBS in the U.S.A.
 Best Instrumental Album of the Year for "Trifecta" (2010 – Juno Nomination – Canada's Equivalent to the Grammy's)
 Best Instrumental Album of the Year for "Fantasia" (2000 – Juno Nomination) 
 Performs average of 150 concerts per year
 Half Million Records Sold worldwide 
 Two Gold Albums (Fantasia and Pavlo) 
 Selected and Performed for His Royal Highness Prince Charles (April 2001) 
 In 2002, Pavlo won a lawsuit against R&B Mega Stars: R-Kelly and Jay-Z.  The R&B stars sampled Pavlo's music and made a Top 10 hit song "Fiesta" based on Pavlo's original melody "Fantasia". Pavlo's actual guitar work was lifted and placed repeatedly into the song 27 times.  Pavlo now shares in the publishing of the song as a co-writer.
 World Artist of the Year (2005) 
 Billboard Top 10 (May 2005) 
 Touring Artist of the Year (2006) 
 Montreal Jazz Festival – Headlined Main Stage for 20,000 + people (2006) 
 Top Choice Awards 2006 "Greek Man of the Year"
 Top Choice Awards 2007 "Greek Man of the Year"
 Smooth Jazz Guitarist of the Year (2007 Nomination) 
 Music Featured in "So You Think You Can Dance"; Marine Life (starring Cybill Shepherd); CTV's Eleventh Hour;Just Cause; Showcase/Showtime L Word; The Chris Isaak Show (2 episodes)
 Pavlo owns his own line of nylon string acoustic guitars retailing online and across Canada, called "Pavlo, Signature Series".  
 Pavlo is known for giving away his guitar to someone in the audience at every concert
 Pavlo organized a Canadian Guitar Trio made of himself and 2 Time Juno Award Winner, Oscar Lopez and Rock and Roll Hall of Famer, Rik Emmett (Rock Group, Triumph).  Together they composed all songs on their album "Trifecta" which was later nominated for 2010 Juno, and they completed a national sold out tour.

Discography

Studio albums

Video albums

Other Appearances 
Vasyl Popadiuk – III (2004) (Produced by Pavlo, written by Pavlo & Konstantine)
Konstantine – Mediterranean Rendezvous (2004)

Other Compilation Appearances 
Tabu: Mondo Flamenco (2001) (Narada)
Camino Latino / Latin Journey – Liona Maria Boyd (2002) (Moston)
Guitar Greats: The Best of New Flamenco – Volume II (2002) (Baja/TSR Records)
Barcelona: Music Celebrating the Flavors of the World (2004) (Williams Sonoma)
The World of the Spanish Guitar Vol. 1 (2011) (Higher Octave Music)
Guitar Greats: The Best of New Flamenco – Volume III (2013) (Baja/TSR Records)

See also 
New Flamenco
Flamenco rumba
Oscar Lopez
Rik Emmett

References

External links 

Living people
Canadian guitarists
1969 births
Canadian people of Greek descent